Bonnie Nardi is an emeritus professor of the Department of Informatics at the University of California, Irvine, where she led the TechDec research lab in the areas of Human-Computer Interaction and computer-supported cooperative work. She is well known for her work on activity theory, interaction design, games, social media, and society and technology.  She was elected to the ACM CHI academy in 2013. She retired in 2018.

Work

Prior to teaching at the University of California, Nardi worked at AT&T Labs, Agilent, Hewlett-Packard and Apple labs. She is among anthropologists who have been employed  by high-tech companies to examine consumers' behavior in their homes and offices.

Nardi collaborated with Victor Kaptelinin to write Acting with Technology: Activity Theory and Interaction Design (2009) and Activity Theory in HCI: Fundamentals and Reflections (2012). These works discuss activity theory and offer a basis for understanding our relationship with technology.

Interests

Her interests are in the areas of human-computer interaction, computer supported cooperative work, more specifically in activity theory, computer-mediated communication, and interaction design. Nardi has researched CSCW applications and blogging, and has more recently pioneered the study of World of Warcraft in HCI. She has studied the use of technology in offices, hospitals, schools, libraries and laboratories. 

She is widely known among librarians – especially research, reference and digital librarians – for Chapter 7 of Information Ecologies, which focused on librarians as keystone species in information ecologies. Nardi's book inspired the title of a UK conference Information Ecologies: the impact of new information 'species'''  hosted, inter alia, by the UK Office of Library Networking, now known by its acronym UKOLN, and led to a keynote address by Nardi at a 1998 Library of Congress Institute on Reference Service in a Digital Age. She had written Information Ecologies while a researcher at ATT Labs Research.

Nardi's self-described theoretical orientation is "activity theory" –  aka Cultural-Historical Activity Theory (CHAT) -, a philosophical framework developed by the Russian psychologists Vygotsky, Luria, Leont'ev, and their students. "My interests are user interface design, collaborative work, computer-mediated communication, and theoretical approaches to technology design and evaluation." She is currently conducting an ethnographic study of World of Warcraft.  According to Oklahoma Senator Tom Coburn's Wastebook 2010, Nardi received a $100,000 grant to "analyze and understand the ways in which players of World of Warcraft, a popular multiplayer game, engage in creative collaboration".  In Coburn's list of 100 supposedly-wasteful federal spending projects, Nardi's project came in at number 6, with Coburn's report saying, "Most people have to work for a living, others get to play video games."Tom Coburn, Wastebook 2010 A Guide to Some of the Most Wasteful Government Sending of 2010 , December 2010.  World of Warcraft is a popular game made by the large Irvine-based Blizzard Entertainment, local to UC Irvine.

Background

Nardi received her undergraduate degree from University of California at Berkeley and her PhD from the School of Social Sciences at University of California, Irvine.  Nardi also spent a year in Western Samoa doing postdoctoral research.

Selected bibliography

 
 
 
 
 
 
 
 
 

 Nardi, B., D. Schiano, and M. Gumbrecht (2004). Blogging as social activity, or, Would you let 900 million people read your diary? Proceedings of the Conference on Computer-Supported Cooperative Work. New York: ACM Press, pp. 222–228.
 Nardi, B., S. Whittaker, and E. Bradner (2000). Interaction and Outeraction: Instant messaging in action. Proceedings Conference on Computer-supported Cooperative Work. New York: ACM Press, pp. 79–88.
 Gantt, M. and B. Nardi (1992). Gardeners and gurus: Patterns of collaboration among CAD users. Proceedings of the ACM Conference on Human Factors in Computer Systems, pp. 107–117.
 Nardi, B., and J. Miller (1990). An ethnographic study of distributed problem solving in spreadsheet development. Proceedings of the Conference on Computer-Supported Cooperative Work'', pp. 197–208.

See also
 Digital anthropology
 Information ecology
 Digital library
 Digital librarian
 Lucy Suchman
 Terry Winograd
 Mark Weiser
 Paul Dourish

Notes and references

External links
home page
UKOLN
Department of Informatics
ATT Labs Research

Interface designers
American librarians
American women librarians
Year of birth missing (living people)
Living people
University of California, Irvine faculty
Human–computer interaction researchers
Video game researchers
21st-century American women